The Horsfall family was a family notable in Liverpool, UK, especially as religious benefactors whose churches are among the most important religious buildings in the city.

Charles Horsfall 

Charles Horsfall (1776-1846) was born in Yorkshire and earned his fortune as a merchant and slave-holder in Jamaica before returning to England around 1803 and settling in Everton near Liverpool. He was mayor of Liverpool in 1832.

He subscribed to the fund to build St George's Church, Everton.

On his death, his 13 children built Christ Church, Great Homer Street, Everton in his memory.  It was consecrated on 30 October 1848, but was destroyed by German bombing in the Liverpool Blitz of 1941.

Thomas Berry Horsfall 

Thomas Berry Horsfall (1805-1878), son of Charles, was Member of Parliament for Liverpool for over 15 years, as well as Lord Mayor of Liverpool.

Robert Horsfall 

Robert Horsfall (1807-1881), son of Charles, was a stockbroker of Anglo-Catholic views.

In 1846-8 he was the primary commissioner of Christ Church, Great Homer Street, Everton, on land donated by his elder brother Thomas, in memory of their father. In 1869 he founded both the church of St James the Less, Kirkdale (later destroyed, along with Christ Church Everton, in the May 1941 blitz) and the Church of St Margaret of Antioch, Liverpool.

George Horsfall 

George Horsfall (1824–1900), son of Charles, was a successful merchant and staunchly Evangelical. He founded Christ Church, Toxteth Park in 1871.

Douglas Horsfall 

Howard Douglas Horsfall (1856-1936), son of Robert, founded:

 Church of St Agnes and St Pancras, Toxteth Park in 1885
 St Faith's Church, Great Crosby, in 1900 
 St Paul's Church, Stoneycroft in 1916

He was also principal benefactor of St Chad's College in the University of Durham.

His sons included Olympic and Oxford rower Major Ewart Horsfall (1892-1974).

References 

People from Everton
English families